"Peter Grimes" is a 1964 television play broadcast by the Australian Broadcasting Corporation. It was based on the opera by Benjamin Britten and directed by Christopher Muir.

It aired as part of Wednesday Theatre.

Cast
Gloria McDonall as Ellen
Keith Neilson as Balstrode
Lanris Elms as Mrs. Sedle

Production
The movie was shot in Melbourne.

References

External links
 

1964 television plays
1964 Australian television episodes
1960s Australian television plays
Australian television plays based on operas
Wednesday Theatre (season 1) episodes